The Patía Valley dry forests (NT0225) is an ecoregion in southwestern Colombia. It covers a dry valley surrounded by mountains.
The original habitat has mostly been destroyed by human activity, although a few pockets remain.

Location
The Patía Valley is in southwestern Colombia along the Patía River and its tributaries, surrounded by ranges of the Andes.
It is almost completely surrounded by the Northwestern Andean montane forests ecoregion.
The western extension downstream along the Patía River merges into the Chocó–Darién moist forests ecoregion..

Physical

The Patía river flows westward from the Central massif of Colombia, cuts through the Western Cordillera and drains into the Pacific Ocean.
In its upper section it runs through cloud forests and montane forests. The central section of the river forms the Patía dry valley.
The lower section to the west of the Western Cordillera flows through the Chocó jungles of the Pacific region.
The Patía is fed by the Quilcacé, Guachicono, Mayo, Juanambú, Pasto and Guaitara rivers.
The soils are sedimentary in origin, with areas of ash from the Puracé and Sotará volcanoes.

Climate

The Köppen climate classification is "As": equatorial; summer dry.
There are rainy seasons from October to November and from April to June.
Mean annual rainfall is under .

At a sample location in the mountains to the south at coordinates  the mean monthly temperature is almost constant at just over  throughout the year.

Ecology

The Patía Valley dry forests ecoregion is in the neotropical realm, in the tropical and subtropical dry broadleaf forests biome.
The valley has been isolated from similar dry forests areas for long enough for unique flora and fauna to evolve.
The ecoregion is part of the  Tumbesian-Andean Valleys Dry Forests global ecoregion, which holds six terrestrial ecoregions: Tumbes–Piura dry forests, Ecuadorian dry forests, Patía Valley dry forests, Magdalena Valley dry forests, Cauca Valley dry forests and Marañón dry forests. 
The fauna and flora of the global ecoregion have high levels of endemism.

Flora
Ranching and farming, with fire used to clear the land, have destroyed almost all the original vegetation.
There are some endemic sub-species.
Common plants in the dry valley now include Crescentia cujete, Guazuma ulmifolia, Cassia fistula, Bursera graveolens, Spondias mombin, Bauhinia picta, Ceiba pentandra and Gliricidia sepium. 
The cactus Pilosocereus colombianus is found in some place, as are Opuntia species 
The orchid Schomburgkia splendida grows in rocky places.

Fauna

There are no endemic species, but some endemic sub-species of birds and butterflies, including the steely-vented hummingbird (Amazilia saucerottei australis).
Until recently there were many mammals.
Remote parts of the valley are still home to collared peccary (Pecari tajacu), red brocket (Mazama americana), Central American agouti (Dasyprocta punctata), ocelot (Leopardus pardalis) and cougar (Puma concolor).
A population of Andean condor (Vultur gryphus) once nested on the steep walls of the Juanambú and Guaitara rivers, but that species is no longer found in the region.
Endangered mammals include Baird's tapir (Tapirus bairdii) and mountain tapir  (Tapirus pinchaque).

Status

The World Wildlife Fund gives the Patía Valley dry forests ecoregion the status "Critical/Endangered".
Most of the valley has been drastically modified by human activity, but there are still pockets of original vegetation and there are some efforts at conservation on privately owned land.
Threats come from excessive hunting and collection of firewood, urban sprawl, agriculture, livestock and road construction.

Notes

Sources

Neotropical dry broadleaf forests
Ecoregions of Colombia